My Best Girl is a 1927 American silent romantic comedy film directed by Sam Taylor starring Mary Pickford and Charles "Buddy" Rogers that was produced by Pickford.

The film is notable for co-starring Rogers, who would be Pickford's future husband. Charles Rosher received an Academy Award nomination for his cinematography of this film in 1928.

Plot
The film starts out at The Merrill Department store where a very exhausted stockgirl named Maggie Johnson (Mary Pickford) is given a moment to attend to the sales counter. There she encounters a charming handsome man who pretends to be interested in purchasing some children's toys but, after many humorous demonstrations by Maggie, the manager comes over and gives the man his time card. The man is said to be Joe Grant (Buddy Rogers) though in reality he is the son of the owner; making him Joseph Merrill. To prove to his father he is ready for his engagement, he has taken the job of stockboy under an assumed name.

Annoyed, Maggie takes Joe back to the stockroom and tells him to get to work. He is so inept that she calls him, 'The Dumbest Stockboy in the World' though she promises to take him under her wing, much to his amusement.

A few days later, after her shift, Maggie is outside waiting for Joe. She appears to have a crush on him. Some of her coworkers tease her but eventually warn her that Joe is coming, causing Maggie to hop on her ride home from work: the back of an open truck. Joe is swarmed with salesgirls who try for his attention causing him to not focus on Maggie. Determined Maggie throws her bag on the ground as the vehicle pulls away. Joe picks it up and chases the truck down to give it to her. After three more times of this, he finally grows weary and jumps in the truck to join Maggie, who feigns innocence.

The two flirt and Maggie shows him pictures of her off-kilter family. Once they reach her home, she invites him in for supper only to find her family is causing a commotion. Her father (Lucien Littlefield) is an elderly postal worker who is meek and easily subdued.  Her mother (Sunshine Hart) is a dramatic woman who enjoys going to random funerals and makes frequent use of smelling salts to avoid fainting. Her sister Liz (Carmelita Geraghty) is a flapper who has a boyfriend who gets her into trouble. Maggie does her best to hide the goings on but eventually caves and sends Joe on his way hoping to have dinner with him another day.

Time passes and Joe's mother is planning his engagement announcement party. However, she has not mentioned it to him, hoping to make it a surprise. Joe has been promoted and is now Maggie's boss. However, he still eats lunch with her every day in the stockroom. During one such lunch, after receiving the note to join his parents for dinner (for the surprise party), Maggie gives him a watch for his birthday. He is touched and puts it on. Shortly after this he accidentally catches his sleeve on a nail. Trying to pull himself free, he accidentally puts his arm around Maggie, and after the mutual surprise the two kiss.

Enamored with each other they head out on the town to walk in the rain. Joe begins to spend money and she tells him he'll end up in the poorhouse. Joe offers to buy her dinner at a nice restaurant but, embarrassed by her shoddy work clothes, Maggie declines. Joe gets the idea to tell her they should follow the store's company motto, "We're all a family" and that, if they were family, they could eat at the Merrill Mansion. Maggie, thinking he is joking, agrees. Meanwhile, her sister is arrested because of her association with her boyfriend and is taken to night court.  Her family frets at not being able to find Maggie, who they believe needs to help Liz out of the mess. Maggie had tried to call them, but after a few rings (while her father made his way to the phone) she hung up.

Arriving at the Merrill Mansion, Maggie is amazed that it is the real deal. Joe is amused by her reluctance but eventually gets her into the mansion, much to the butler's amusement. Maggie is extremely reluctant until Joe convinces the butler to say 'a Merrill employee eats here almost every night!' Maggie relaxes and tells Joe they should pretend to be Mr. and Mrs. Merrill. Joe is extremely amused by this, and at her lack of formal dinner habits.

At the surprise engagement party, Joe's family sits concerned. They return home to find Joe and Maggie, who has hidden under the table. Joe admits he is 'Joseph Merrill' but before he can explain further his fiancée (Avonne Taylor) arrives and kisses him in front of Maggie. Maggie, heartbroken leaves. Joe, upset, tells his fiancée he had broken Maggie's heart and must go after her.

Maggie walks and walks until she returns to where Joe and her shared a moment which happens to be by the night court. She sees her family arrive and after they chasten her they enter the court to try to save Liz from prison. Meanwhile, Joe arrives at the same spot only to be helped by a homeless man who had watched their interactions. Joe enters the court to hear Maggie's passionate plea for her sister, whom the judge eventually lets go.

While Maggie fetches water for her 'on the verge of fainting' mother, Joe walks over to Maggie and apologizes, saying he did not love his fiancée and would not marry her. He then proposes to Maggie which causes (for a change) her sister to faint. While everyone tries to revive Liz, Liz's boyfriend makes a remark to her father about Maggie 'taking up with the Merrill boy' implying that it was only for sex. Joe, offended, punches him and begins to fight in the courtroom.

The next day, Maggie is back home, reading the paper which has headlines about their romance. Joe's father (Hobart Bosworth) arrives at the home. He tells Maggie he wants to send his son to Hawaii until the scandal blew over, which Joe agreed to. However, Joe apparently made plans to bring Maggie as well and marry on the boat. Mr. Merrill, not happy with this, tries to buy Maggie off with a check for $10,000 just as Joe arrives, unaware his father is there. Joe tells Maggie his plans and she becomes upset. Angry, she begins a whole tirade against him trying to find out if he really loved her or not. She begins to claim she is just a jazz girl and knew who he was all along. That she was a gold digger and just after his money and, thanks to his father, she now had what she wanted. She even plays a jazz record and puts on lipstick in an attempt to prove her point.

Joe begins to cry, and Maggie, touched, breaks down and admits that none of it is true and the real reason she cannot go away with him is because of her family (who had been listening in the living room the whole time) who needs her more than he does. Her father becomes livid and declares it was time 'he became the father of the family' and takes charge of his wife and daughters. In a comedic scene he commands everyone (including both Merrills) to pack Maggie's things for the ship which leaves in ten minutes.

After an extreme car ride, the couple barely make it to the departing boat. Once boarded, the father realizes he never gave Maggie her suitcase. He tries to throw the suitcase onto the boat, but it ends up in the ocean. The couple waves goodbye and eventually get crowded back from view. When the crowd leaves, we see the couple kissing.

Cast
 Mary Pickford as Maggie Johnson
 Charles "Buddy" Rogers as Joseph 'Joe' Grant (Merrill)
 Sunshine Hart as Ma Johnson
 Lucien Littlefield as Pa Johnson
 Carmelita Geraghty as Elizabeth 'Liz' Johnson
 Hobart Bosworth as Father Robert E. Merrill
 Evelyn Hall as Mother Esther Merrill
 Avonne Taylor as Millicent Rogers
 Mack Swain as The Judge
 Carole Lombard as Flirty Salesgirl (uncredited)

Release
The film was first released in 1927.  It had a budget of $483,103 and grossed about $1,027,757 in the US alone on its first run.  The Mary Pickford Corporation owns the copyright.  A complete print of the film survives in mostly good condition.  It was released on DVD by The Milestone Collection in 1999.

Legacy
My Best Girl was restored in 2015 by the UCLA Film and Television Archive based on the Archive's earlier restoration, which combines the best shots from two 35mm acetate fine grain master positives owned by the Mary Pickford Foundation and a 1940s-era 16mm print from the Mary Pickford Collection at the Library of Congress, and features remade titles to improve the overall appearance of the film. The new restoration was first shown as part of the 17th edition of the UCLA Film and Television Archive's biennial "Festival of Preservation" in 2015.

Pickford biographer Jeffrey Vance, quoted in the UCLA Film and Television Archive's "Festival of Preservation" 2015 program notes, relates, “What makes My Best Girl special is that it captures the miracle of two people falling in love with each other as their characters do. It is challenging to capture genuine emotion on a cold piece of celluloid, but falling in love is beautifully immortalized in My Best Girl.”

On October 31, 2017 the restaurant Best Girl opened on the ground floor of the Ace Hotel in downtown Los Angeles, 90 years from the release date of the movie and named in its honor.

The film is recognized by American Film Institute in these lists:
 2002: AFI's 100 Years...100 Passions – Nominated

References

External links

My Best Girl at silentera.com, with a DVD link
Stills at silenthollywood.com

1927 films
American black-and-white films
American silent feature films
1927 romantic comedy films
Films directed by Sam Taylor
Films set in department stores
United Artists films
Films based on American novels
American romantic comedy films
Surviving American silent films
1920s American films
Silent romantic comedy films
Silent American comedy films